The 1952 Challenge Desgrange-Colombo was the fifth edition of the Challenge Desgrange-Colombo. It included eleven races: all the races form the 1951 edition were retained with no additions. Ferdinand Kübler won his second edition, having previously won in 1950. Italy won the nations championship.

Races

Final standings

Riders

Nations

References

 
Challenge Desgrange-Colombo
Challenge Desgrange-Colombo